Stanley 'Stan' George Taylor (born 1937), is an athletics coach and a former athlete who competed for England.

Athletics career
He represented England in the 880 yards and 1 mile races at the 1962 British Empire and Commonwealth Games in Perth, Western Australia.

He has been affiliated to the Manchester Harriers, Blackpool and Wyre & Fylde.

References

1937 births
English male middle-distance runners
Athletes (track and field) at the 1962 British Empire and Commonwealth Games
Living people
Commonwealth Games competitors for England